Bimberi is a locality in the Snowy Valleys Council area of New South Wales, Australia.

References

Localities in New South Wales
Snowy Valleys Council